Sir Syed Muhammad Fakhruddin Khan Bahadur (1868-1933) was the first Muslim Education Minister of Bihar and Orissa from 1921 to 1933. He was the member of the Bihar Provincial Association. He was elected to Bihar and Orissa Legislative Council in 1921 was there till his death in 1933. He is known one of the Creator of Patna University.

Early life and education 
Syed Muhammad Fakhruddin was born to Syed Mohammad Ali in Village Dumri Near Patna. Fakhruddin was student of Mohammad Yahya, the husband of Rasheedun Nisa. Rasheedun Nisa was the first Urdu Novel writer.

Fakhruddin completed his Bachelor of Arts from Patna College in 1891 and Bachelor of Law in 1893.

References 

1868 births
1933 deaths